The Attorney-General of Belize is a cabinet-level official who acts as the principal legal adviser to the government of Belize.

Overview
The position of AG is outlined in Section 42 of the Constitution of Belize, which requires that the AG have been qualified for at least five years to practice as an advocate in a court of unlimited jurisdiction in the Commonwealth of Nations or Ireland. Civil proceedings for and against the State are taken in the name of the Attorney General.

Prior to 2010, the constitution also required that the AG be a member of the House of Representatives or the Senate of Belize. As part of the Belize Constitution (Seventh Amendment) Bill, the government proposed to remove this restriction; the same bill also proposed to replace the right of appeal to the Judicial Committee of the Privy Council with the Caribbean Court of Justice, and to allow dual citizens to become members of Parliament. The thinking behind this amendment was that an unelected AG could avoid becoming embroiled in partisan politics.

Then-AG Wilfred Elrington, who concurrently held the post of Minister of Foreign Affairs and Minister of Foreign Trade, justified the proposed changes by pointing out that he was already overworked due to his three positions, and that changing the requirement would allow the PM to tap the best talent from the private sector to become AG. However, in the House, Mark Espat (PUP) criticised the bill as creating a special privilege for lawyers to get around the ordinary electoral process on their way to the Cabinet, while Said Musa stated that the change should be unnecessary given that the PM already had the power to appoint a 13th member to the Senate; despite these concerns, the bill passed the House (though with the dual-citizenship MP provisions stripped out. In the Senate, Henry Gordon and Godwin Hulse expressed concern over this change, but the bill passed the Senate as well by a vote of eight-to-two with two abstentions.

List of attorneys-general

British Honduras (1862–1973)
Sir Alexander Campbell Onslow, 1878–1880
(Sir) Henry Rawlins Pipon Schooles 1880–1883 
Sir W. Meigh Goodman KC, 1883–1886
Charles Reginald Hoffmeister, 1886–1893
Leslie Probyn 1893–96 (afterwards Attorney General of Grenada, 1896)
Sir Frederic Mackenzie Maxwell, 1896–1907 (afterwards Chief Justice of British Honduras, 1907)
Henry Eugene Walter Grant, 1902–1903 (acting)
C.R. Davies, c.1907
Lancelot Elphinstone, 1913–?1919 (afterwards Solicitor General of Trinidad, 1919)
Sir George O'Donnell Walton, 1919-?1921 (afterwards Chief Justice of Grenada, 1921)
Hon. Willoughby Bullock, c. 1926-?1928 (afterwards Chief Justice of St Vincent, 1928)
Sidney Alexander Roger McKinstry, 1932–c.1941 
O.L. Bancroft, 1941  (acting)
Harold John Hughes, 1941–1950 
Cyril George Xavier Henriques, 1950–1956 (afterwards Chief Justice of the Windward and Leeward Islands, 1958)
Charles Francis Henville, c. 1956–1968
John Kingsley Havers, c. 1968–1973

Belize
Vernon Harrison Courtenay, c. 1974 - c. 1979
Said Musa, 1979–84 under PM George Cadle Price
Hubert Elrington, 1984–86 under PM Manuel Esquivel
Dean Barrow, 1986–89 under PM Manuel Esquivel
Glenn Godfrey 1989–93 under PM George Cadle Price
Dean Barrow, 1993–98 (second) under PM Manuel Esquivel
Godfrey Smith, 1999–2003 under PM Said Musa
Eamon Harrison Courtenay SC, 2004 – c. 2007 under PM Said Musa
Francis Fonseca, c. 2007 under PM Said Musa
Wilfred Elrington, 2008–10 under PM Dean Barrow
Bernard Q. Pitts, 2010–12 under PM Dean Barrow
Wilfred Elrington (second), 2012–2015 under PM Dean Barrow
 Vanessa Retreage, 2015 - 2017 under PM Dean Barrow.
 Michael Peyrefitte, 2017 - 2020 under PM Dean Barrow.
Magali-Marin-Young, 2020 – present under PM Johnny Briceño

References

External links
Senate of Belize Debate on the Belize Constitution (Seventh Amendment) Bill, 23 February 2010

 
Attorney-general